Kathleen Le Messurier was a female tennis player from Australia who was active in the 1920s and 1930s.

Le Messurier was the youngest daughter of Ernest and Jessie Le Messurier. She played competitive tennis for the Methodist Ladies College and later the Semaphore and East Torrens Tennis Clubs.

Le Messurier was a runner-up in the 1932 Australian Championships singles competition, losing in the final to compatriot Coral McInnes Buttsworth in straight sets, 4–6, 7–9. She also reached the doubles final in 1924, 1925, 1928 and 1932 but lost on all four occasions.

In October 1927 she won the singles and doubles title at the Adelaide Championships. In March 1928 she won the South Australian Championships played in Adelaide.

Grand Slam finals

Singles (1 runner-up)

Doubles (4 runner-ups)

See also 
 Performance timelines for all female tennis players who reached at least one Grand Slam final

References

External links
 Katherine Le Mesurier, Australian Open profile
 The Australian Women's Register

Australian female tennis players
Year of birth missing
1981 deaths
Sportswomen from South Australia
Tennis players from Adelaide